This is a list of United Kingdom Biodiversity Action Plan species. Some suffer because of loss of habitat, but many are in decline following the introduction of foreign species, which out-compete the native species or carry disease.

See also the list of extinct animals of the British Isles.

This list includes the 116 species identified as requiring action plans in the Biodiversity Steering Group's report of December 1995.

Mammals
Scottish wildcat (Felis silvestris grampia)
Bottlenose dolphin (Tursiops truncatus), warm and temperate seas worldwide
European (brown) hare (Lepus europaeus), northern, central, and western Europe and western Asia
Hazel dormouse (Muscardinus avellanarius), northern Europe and Asia Minor
European otter (Lutra lutra lutra), Asia, Africa and Europe
Greater horseshoe bat (Rhinolophus ferrumequinium), Europe, Africa, South Asia and Australia
Harbour porpoise (Phocoena phocoena), coastal waters in the Northern Hemisphere
Red squirrel (Sciurus vulgaris leucourus), Eurasia (subspecies endemic to Great Britain)
Water vole (Arvicola amphibius), Great Britain, northern and central Europe and in parts of Russia
European (western) hedgehog (Erinaceus europaeus)

Birds
List of UK BAP priority bird species.
Aquatic warbler (Acrocephalus paludicola), passage migrant through UK
Capercaillie (Tetrao urogallus)
Corn crake (Crex crex), globally threatened
Eurasian wryneck (Jynx torquilla)
Great bittern (Botarus stellaris)
Grey partridge (Perdix perdix)
Red-backed shrike (Lanius collurio)
Eurasian skylark (Alauda arvensis)
Slavonian grebe (Podiceps auritus)
Song thrush (Turdus philomelos)
Hen harrier (Circus cyaneus)
Willow tit (Poecile montanus)
Marsh tit (Poecile palustris)
Corn bunting (Miliaria calandra)
Common cuckoo (Cuculus canorus)
Eurasian golden oriole (Oriolus oriolus)
Hawfinch (Coccothraustes coccthraustes)
House sparrow (Passer domesticus)
Eurasian tree sparrow (Passer montanus)
European turtle dove (Streptopelia turtur)
Common starling (Sturnus vulgaris)
Marsh warbler (Acrocephalus palustris)
Red-necked phalarope (Phalaropus lobatus)
Wood warbler (Phylloscopus sibilatrix)
Roseate tern (Sterna dougallii)
Common nightingale (Luscinia megarhynchos)
Lesser spotted woodpecker (Picoides minor)
Northern lapwing (Vanellus vanellus)
Cirl bunting (Emberiza cirlus)
Yellowhammer (Emberiza citrinella)
Western yellow wagtail (Motacilla flava)
Black-tailed godwit (Limosa limosa)
Ruff (Philomachus pugnax)
European herring gull (Larus argentatus)
Lesser black-backed gull (Larus fuscus)
Little tern (Sternula albifrons)

Reptiles
Slow-worm (Anguis fragilis), Eurasia
Sand lizard (Lacerta agilis), most of Europe and eastwards to Mongolia
Northern or European adder (Vipera berus), Western Europe and Asia
Barred grass snake (Natrix helvetica), England, Wales and mainland Europe
Smooth snake (Coronella austriaca), northern and central Europe, Middle East

Amphibians
Great crested newt (Triturus cristatus), Europe and parts of Asia
Natterjack toad (Bufo calamita), Northern Europe

Fish

Allis shad (Alosa alosa)
Pollan (Coregonus autumnalis pollan)
Twaite shad (Alosa fallax)
Vendace (Coregonus vandesius)
Gwyniad (Coregonus pennantii)
European eel (Anguilla anguilla)
Brown Trout (Salmo trutta)

Insects

Ants
Black-backed meadow ant (Formica pratensis), possibly extinct
Black bog ant (Formica candida)
Narrow-headed ant (Formica exsecta)

Bees
Shrill carder bee (Bombus sylvarum)
 Wool carder bee

Beetles
Beaulieu dung beetle (Aphodius niger), a dung beetle
Blue ground beetle (Carabus intricatus)
Bembidion argenteolum, a ground beetle
Crucifix ground beetle (Panagaeus cruxmajor), a ground beetle
Hazel pot beetle (Cryptocephalus coryli), a leaf beetle
Lizard weevil (Cathormiocerus britannicus), probably endemic
Orbera oculata, a longhorn beetle
Pashford pot beetle (Cryptocephalus exiguus), a leaf beetle, probably endemic and extinct
Stag beetle (Lucanus cervus)
Lough Neagh camphor beetle (Stenus palposus), a rove beetle
Tachys edmonsi, a ground beetle, endemic
Violet click beetle (Limoniscus violaceus)
Tansy beetle (Chrysolina graminis)

Butterflies and moths
Black hairstreak (Satyrium pruni)
Bright wave (Idaea ochrata)
Brown hairstreak (Thecla betulae)
Chequered skipper (Carterosephalus palaemon)
Dingy skipper (Erynnis tages)
Duke of Burgundy (Hamearis lucina)
Flounced chestnut (Agrochola helvola)
Glanville fritillary (Melitaea cinxia)
Grayling (Hipparchia semele)
Greenweed flat-body moth (Agonopterix atomella), a micro-moth
Grey dagger (Acronicta psi)
Grizzled skipper (Pyrgus malvae)
Heath fritillary (Mellicta athalia)
High brown fritillary (Argynnis adippe)
Knot grass (Acronicta rumicis)
Large blue (Maculinea arion), endemic subspecies extinct, re-established from Swedish stock
Large heath (Coenonympha tullia)
Lulworth skipper (Thymelicus acteon)
Marsh fritillary (Eurodryas aurinia)
Netted carpet moth (Eustroma reticulatum)
Northern brown argus (Aricia artaxerxes)
Pearl-bordered fritillary (Boloria euphrosyne)
Reddish buff (Acosmetia caliginosa)
Silver-spotted skipper (Hesperia comma)
Silver-studded blue (Plebejus argus)
Small blue (Cupido minimus)
Small heath (Coenonympha pamphilus)
Small mountain ringlet (Erebia epiphron)
Small pearl-bordered fritillary (Boloria selene)
Small tortoiseshell (Aglais urticaria)
Speckled footman (Coscinia cribraria)
Wall (Lasiommata megera)
White admiral (Limenitis camilla)
White-letter hairstreak (Satyrium w-album)
Wood white (Leptidea sinapis)
V-Moth (Macaria wauaria)

Crickets
European mole cricket (Gryllotalpa gryllotalpa)

Damselflies
Southern damselfly (Coenagrion mercuriale)

Flies
Golden Hoverfly (Callicera spinolae)
Broken-banded Wasp-hoverfly (Chrysotoxum octomaculatum)
Hornet robberfly (Asilus crabroniformis), Southern England and South & West Wales
Manx robber fly (Machimus cowini),

Grasshoppers 
Large marsh grasshopper (Stethophyma grossum)

Crustaceans
White clawed crayfish (Austropotamobius pallipes)

Molluscs
Gastropods
Freshwater snails:
Glutinous snail (Myxas glutinosa)
Little whirlpool ram's-horn snail (Anisus vorticulus)
Shining ram's-horn snail (Segmentina nitida)
Land snails:
Narrow-mouthed whorl snail (Vertigo angustior)
Round-mouthed whorl snail (Vertigo genesii)
Geyer's whorl snail (Vertigo geyeri)
Desmoulin's whorl snail (Vertigo moulinsiana)
Sandbowl snail (Catinella arenaria)
Bivalves
Depressed river mussel (Pseudanodonta complanata)
Freshwater pearl mussel (Margaritifera margaritifera)
Fine-lined pea mussel (Pisidium tenuilineatum)

Other invertebrates
Freshwater:
Medicinal leech (Hirudo medicinalis)
Marine:
Ivell's sea anemone (Edwardsia ivelli), endemic and probably extinct
Starlet sea anemone (Nematostella vectensis)

Plants

Trees
 Common juniper (Juniperus communis)
 Plymouth Pear (Pyrus Cordata)

Flowering plants
Creeping marshwort (Apium repens)
Early gentian (Gentianella anglica), endemic
Eyebrights (Euphrasia sp.), endemic
Fen orchid (Liparis loeselii)
Floating water-plantain (Luronium natans)
Holly-leaved naiad (Najas marina)
Isle of Man cabbage (Coincya monensis), endemic
Lady's slipper orchid (Cypripedium calceolus)
Lundy cabbage (Coincya wrightii), endemic
Mountain scurvy-grass (Cochlearia micacea), probably endemic
Norwegian mugwort (Artemisia norvegica)
Ribbon-leaved water plantain (Alisma gramineum)
Shetland pondweed (Potamogeton rutilus)
Shore dock (Rumex rupestris)
Slender naiad (Najas flexilis)
Star fruit (Damasonium alisma)
Three-lobed crowfoot (Ranunculus tripartitus)
Western ramping-fumitory (Fumaria occidentalis), endemic
Wild cotoneaster (Cotoneaster cambricus), probably endemic
Yellow marsh saxifrage (Saxifraga hirculus)
Young's helleborine orchid (Epipactis youngiana), endemic

Fungi
Devil's bolete (Boletus satanas)
Sandy stilt puffball (Battarraea phalloides)
White stalkball (Tulostoma niveum)

Lichens
Elm's gyalecta (Gyalecta ulmi)
Orange-fruited elm-lichen (Caloplaca luteoalba)
Pseudocyphellaria aurata
Pseudocyphellaria novegica
River jelly lichen (Collema dishotomum)
Schismatomma graphidioides
Starry breck-lichen (Buellia asterella)
morchella

Mosses
Cornish path-moss (Ditrichum cornubicum), endemic
Derbyshire feather-moss (Thamnobryum angustifolium), endemic
Glaucous beard-moss (Didymodon glaucus)
Green shield moss (Buxbaumia viridis)
Slender green feather-moss (Hamatocaulis vernicosus)
Weissia multicapsularis

Liverworts
Atlantic lejeunea (Lejeunea mandonii)
Marsh earwort (Jamesoniella undulifolia)
Norfolk flapwort (Lophozia rutheana)
Petalwort (Petalophyllum ralfsii)
Western rustwort (Marsupella profunda)

Stoneworts
Mossy stonewort (Chara muscosa), probably extinct

See also
List of species and habitats of principal importance in England
Natural Environment and Rural Communities Act 2006
List of habitats of principal importance in Wales

References

External links
 UK BAP Website: UK List of Priority Species and Habitats

Lists of biota of the United Kingdom
.
.
.

Endangered biota of Europe